Gigi Fernández and Natasha Zvereva were the defending champions but only Zvereva competed that year with Lindsay Davenport.

Davenport and Zvereva won in the final 6–1, 6–4 against Amy Frazier and Kimberly Po.

Seeds
Champion seeds are indicated in bold text while text in italics indicates the round in which those seeds were eliminated. The top four seeded teams received byes into the second round.

Draw

Final

Top half

Bottom half

External links
 1996 Acura Classic Doubles Draw

LA Women's Tennis Championships
1996 WTA Tour